King Peak is a rock peak,  high, surmounting the eastern extremity of the Bermel Escarpment,  west-northwest of Mount Powell, in the eastern part of the Thiel Mountains of Antarctica. The name was proposed by Peter Bermel and Arthur B. Ford, co-leaders of the United States Geological Survey (USGS) Thiel Mountains party which surveyed these mountains in 1960–61. It was named for Clarence King, the first director of the USGS, 1879–81. Other peaks in the vicinity are named for subsequent directors of the USGS.

See also
 Mountains in Antarctica

References

Mountains of Ellsworth Land